Aishwarya Sakhuja is an Indian model and actress. She was a Miss India finalist in 2006. From 2010 to 2012, she starred in Sony TV's show Saas Bina Sasural as Toasty. Sakhuja was also seen in other fictional shows, including Main Naa Bhoolungi, Trideviyaan, Rishta.com and Yeh Hai Chahatein. She was also a contestant on Nach Baliye 7 and Fear Factor: Khatron Ke Khiladi 7.

Personal life

Sakhuja married her longtime boyfriend Rohit Nag on 5 December 2014.

Filmography

Films

Television

References

External links

 
 

Living people
Place of birth missing (living people)
21st-century Indian actresses
Indian television actresses
Indian soap opera actresses
Beauty pageant contestants from India
Actresses in Hindi television
Fear Factor: Khatron Ke Khiladi participants
Year of birth missing (living people)